Bukit Jambul is a residential neighbourhood within the Northeast Penang Island District, Penang, Malaysia.

Transportation 

Rapid Penang bus routes 301 and 306 include stops within the neighbourhood of Bukit Jambul. These routes connect the neighbourhood with various destinations along the eastern side of Penang Island, including George Town and its suburbs, as well as the Penang International Airport. The neighbourhood is also served by two of Rapid Penang's Congestion Alleviation Transport (CAT) routes - namely Sungai Dua and Bayan Baru routes - which are provided free-of-charge.

Aside from these routes, Rapid Penang operates an additional three cross-strait shuttle bus routes - BEST A, BEST B and BEST C - which mainly cater to industrial workers who commute on a daily basis between Bukit Jambul, the Bayan Lepas Free Industrial Zone and Seberang Perai on the mainland.

Education 
A high school, SMK Bukit Jambul, is situated within the neighbourhood. In addition, the Penang campus of INTI International University is located within the neighbourhood as well, offering various tertiary courses and twinning programmes with foreign universities.

Sports 
Opened in 1984, the Penang Golf Club, situated within Bukit Jambul, is the sole 18-hole golf course on Penang Island. The golf course hosted the 1992 Malaysian Open, which was won by Vijay Singh, and was last renovated in 2012.

Shopping 

The nine-storey Bukit Jambul Complex was completed in 1997 and is one of the major shopping centres in the area. The mall contains over 400 shoplots and a handful of entertainment outlets, including a bowling alley and a cinema. However, it has also suffered from declining footfall in recent years, due to the 2008 financial crisis.

References 

Neighbourhoods in Penang
George Town, Penang